David Holmes Black (born April 9, 1946), is a Canadian media proprietor who founded and is the majority owner of Black Press Group Ltd. He serves as the company's Chairman, and previously served as its Chief Executive Officer and President.

Black has served as President of the British Columbia and Yukon Community Newspaper Association, a director of the Canadian Community Newspaper Association, a Governor of the Canadian Newspaper Association, and as a Director of the American Press Institute.

Black was inducted the Business Laureates of British Columbia Hall of Fame in 2009. 

As of 2022, Black Press and its subsidiaries own more than 170 titles throughout western Canada and the United States.

Early life and education 
Black was born in Vancouver, British Columbia to Alan and Adelaide Black. He graduated from the University of British Columbia with a degree in civil engineering. He then obtained his MBA at the University of Western Ontario. After school, he briefly worked for Crown Life Insurance in the early '70s.

In 1973, Black was hired to work as a junior business analyst in the acquisitions department at Torstar, which publishes the Toronto Star newspaper.

Black Press 
In 1975, Black purchased the Williams Lake Tribune of Williams Lake, British Columbia for $60,000. The paper had previously been owned since 1969 by his father Alan Black and the paper's publisher Clive Stangoe.

Black operated the Tribune exclusively for four years until purchasing the husband-and-wife owned Ashcroft-Cache Creek Journal in nearby Ashcroft in 1979. Black continued to purchase other newspapers over time and soon formed newspaper clusters around Victoria and Vancouver.

In 1991, Black formed Sound Publishing after he purchased three newspapers on the Kitsap Peninsula in the United States. The subsidy has since managed all of his titles in Washington (state) and Alaska.

In 2001, Black purchased the Honolulu Star-Bulletin. In 2010, Black purchased The Honolulu Advertiser and merged the two Hawaiian papers together to create the Honolulu Star-Advertiser. The paper is managed by a subsidy, Oahu Publications, along with all other publications Black owns in Hawaii.

On September 19., 2002, Torstar announced that it was investing $20 million to acquire a 19.35% share in Black Press. At that time Black Press published 88 newspapers and had 11 printing plants. Annual revues were $240 million.

In 2006, the Black acquired 119,000-circulation Akron Beacon Journal in Ohio from Knight Ridder for $165 million. Prior to buying the Akron paper, Black had bid unsuccessfully on two Philadelphia dailies and a group of weeklies published by the Boston Herald. Black later sold the paper in 2018 to GateHouse Media and acquired the Juneau Empire and two other papers in Alaska from GateHouse.

Black Press and Sound Publishing in 2009 had a collective annual revenue in the $500-million range, Black said interview.

In 2011, Black was one of several newspaper industry veterans who joined together as investors in the San Francisco Newspaper Company to buy the former Hearst flagship The San Francisco Examiner. Media outlets initially reported the paper was purchased by Black's company Black Press, but Black only participated as a private investor and holds shares in the Examiner separately from Black Press.

In 2013, Black purchased The Everett Herald, a daily newspaper near Seattle. It had previously been owned for 35 years by the Washington Post Company.

In March 2021, Black purchased Northern News Services Limited of Yellowknife, Northwest Territories, which publishes five newspapers in the Northwest Territories and two in Nunavut.

Oil refinery 
On August 17, 2012, Black announced he is putting forth a proposal to build a $13.2 billion oil refinery in Kitimat with his company, Kitimat Clean Ltd. The refinery would turn bitumen from the Alberta oil sands into solid pellets for shipment by train to the refinery north. At full capacity, 400,000 barrels of petroleum products would produced a day and hen be loaded onto tankers for shipment to markets globally.

In March 2013, Black said he had teamed with Oppenheimer Investments Group, a Switzerland-based firm, to raise the funds to proceed. At that time the original price tag of the refinery itself had risen to $16 billion due to switching to new technologies to reduce greenhouse gases. Other factors raised the total cost for the Kitimat Clean Refinery Project to $22 billion.

In April 2013, Black said the Industrial and Commercial Bank of China had agreed to become an investor and financial advisor for the project.

In 2016, Black submitted a 129 page project description to federal and provincial regulators for the environmental assessment process. On October 2, 2016, the federal environmental assessment of the project was suspended at the request of the proponent.

Personal life 

Black resides in Victoria, British Columbia. In 1970, Black married Annabeth Cote. The two first met while they were students at the University of British Columbia. The couple had four children together: twin sons Alan and Fraser, and daughters Morgan and Catherine. As of 2012, Black has nine grandchildren. His wife Annabeth died of pancreatic cancer on August 23, 2006.

Riffington Manor 
Black lives at Riffington Manor, a prominent home in Uplands. The property along Beach Drive was built in 1913 for Scottish-born businessman Andrew Wright, one of the principal investors in the Uplands development. The stone for the mansion came from Haddington Island. The two-story house's notable features include 10 fireplaces and an octagonal entrance hall that is rose-windowed at its dome and galleried at the upper level. Four bedrooms, each with a full bathroom and dressing room, occupy the entire upper floor. A reporter for the Times Colonist in 2016 called the property "one of Victoria’s most famous and historic waterfront estates."

Black has rented out the property for use as a film location, with all collected fees donated to the Victoria Hospice Society in his wife's honor. In 2017, the house was used as a location in the fourth film in the Gourmet Detective series. In 2018, the house was a film location for the Hallmark Channel original film "Once upon a Prince."

University of Victoria 
Black is a long-time supporter of the University of Victoria. He served as the first board chair of the Peter B. Gustavson School of Business from 1991 to 1996. Since 2008, the annual Black Press Business Scholarship has awarded $5,000 to up to 37 students from across British Columbia entering the University of Victoria’s Bachelor of Commerce program.

UVic's business school named Black "Distinguished Entrepreneur of the Year" in 2007. The university also awarded Black an honorary degree in 2014.

In 2019, the University of Victoria honored Black by naming the Black Ink Classroom in the David Strong Building lecture hall in his honor.

References 

20th-century Canadian newspaper publishers (people)
21st-century Canadian newspaper publishers (people)
Canadian newspaper chain founders
Living people
1946 births
Torstar people